Phyllonorycter quercus is a moth of the family Gracillariidae. It is known from Palestine and Israel.

The larvae feed on Quercus coccifera. They mine the leaves of their host plant.

References

quercus
Moths of Asia
Moths described in 1931